904 Rockefellia (prov. designation:  or ) is a dark and large background asteroid from the outer regions of the asteroid belt, that measures approximately  in diameter. It was discovered on 29 October 1918, by German astronomer Max Wolf at the Heidelberg-Königstuhl State Observatory. The carbonaceous C-type asteroid (Ch) has a rotation period of 6.8 hours and is rather spherical in shape. It was named after American philanthropist and oil industrialist John D. Rockefeller (1839–1937).

Orbit and classification 

Rockefellia is a non-family asteroid of the main belt's background population when applying the hierarchical clustering method to its proper orbital elements. It orbits the Sun in the outer asteroid belt at a distance of 2.7–3.3 AU once every 5 years and 2 months (1,895 days; semi-major axis of 3 AU). Its orbit has an eccentricity of 0.09 and an inclination of 15° with respect to the ecliptic. The body's observation arc begins at Heidelberg on 6 December 1918, or five weeks after its official discovery observation.

Naming 

This minor planet was named after John D. Rockefeller (1839–1937), an American philanthropist and oilman who founded the Rockefeller Foundation. The official  was mentioned in The Names of the Minor Planets by Paul Herget in 1955.

Physical characteristics 

In the Tholen- and SMASS-like taxonomy of the Small Solar System Objects Spectroscopic Survey (S3OS2), Rockefellia is a Caa and Ch type, respectively, both indicating that it is a hydrated, carbonaceous C-type asteroid.

Rotation period 

In December 2017, a rotational lightcurve of Rockefellia was obtained from photometric observations by Tom Polakis at the Command Module Observatory  in Arizona. Lightcurve analysis gave a rotation period of  hours with a low brightness variation of  magnitude. The result supersedes tentative period determinations by Pierre Antonini (2009), Stephane Fauvaud (2011) and René Roy (2014), which were of lower quality.

Diameter and albedo 

The Collaborative Asteroid Lightcurve Link derives an albedo of 0.0357 and calculates a diameter of 58.51 kilometers based on an absolute magnitude of 10.4.

On 13 May 2005, an asteroid occultation gave a best-fit ellipse dimension of 59.0 × 59.0 kilometers. These timed observations are taken when the asteroid passes in front of a distant star. However the quality of the measurement is rated poorly. A second, lower rated observation on 23 February 2013, measured an ellipse of 61.0 × 61.0 kilometers.

References

External links 
 Lightcurve Database Query (LCDB), at www.minorplanet.info
 Dictionary of Minor Planet Names, Google books
 Asteroids and comets rotation curves, CdR – Geneva Observatory, Raoul Behrend
 Discovery Circumstances: Numbered Minor Planets (1)-(5000) – Minor Planet Center
 
 

000904
Discoveries by Max Wolf
Named minor planets
19181029